Denise Cronenberg (1 October 1938 – 22 May 2020) was a Canadian costume designer. 

Cronenberg was born in Toronto, Ontario and was the sister of film director David Cronenberg and the mother of filmmaker Aaron Woodley. She produced work for films such as Dawn of the Dead and The Incredible Hulk.

Cronenberg and her brother worked together on The Fly, a 2008 operatic adaptation of the 1986 film of the same name.

She died due to "complications from old age" in Burlington, Ontario in May 2020 at the age of 81.

Works
 The Fly (1986)
 Dead Ringers (1988) 
 The Long Road Home (1989) 
 The Guardian (1990) 
 Naked Lunch (1991) 
 M. Butterfly (1993) 
 Moonlight and Valentino (1995) 
 Crash (1996) 
 Murder at 1600 (1997) 
 Mad City (1997) Alan Alda's wardrobe 
 A Cool, Dry Place (1998) 
 The Wager (1998) (also executive producer) 
 eXistenZ (1999) 
 The Third Miracle (1999) 
 Bless the Child (2000) 
 Dracula 2000 (2000) 
 Camera (2000) 
 The Caveman's Valentine (2002) 
 Spider (2002) 
 Avenging Angelo (2002) 
 Rhinoceros Eyes (2003) 
 Dawn of the Dead (2004) 
 A History of Violence (2005) 
 Shoot 'Em Up (2007) 
 The Fly (2008), opera by Howard Shore 
 Resident Evil: Afterlife (2010)

References

External links
 

1938 births
2020 deaths
Canadian costume designers
Jewish Canadian artists
Canadian people of Lithuanian-Jewish descent
Artists from Toronto
Canadian women in film
Women costume designers